Usman Ally (born August 27, 1982) is a Swazi-born Pakistani-American film, stage and television actor. Marking his acting debut in 2008, Ally won an Obie Award in 2015 for his role in The Invisible Hand.

He has appeared in several stage productions including The Elaborate Entrance of Chad Deity, The Jungle Book and a production of Around the World in 80 Days. He is known for his on-screen roles such as Vincent on Agents of S.H.I.E.L.D. and Fernald the Hook-Handed Man in Netflix's adaptation of A Series of Unfortunate Events, which premiered in 2017 and Andy Malik in Suits.

Background
Ally was born in Eswatini (formerly Swaziland) to Pakistani parents. He grew up in Kenya, Botswana, Tanzania, and Pakistan. According to Ally, his father was "involved in trade between African countries — textiles and things of that sort", and hence his parents spent three decades living and moving across southern and eastern Africa.

Ally graduated from the International School of Tanganyika in 2000, where he was part of the school's cricket team, nicknamed "Msenge Wa Duniya" for his bowling.  

At age 18, he moved to the United States and attended Lewis & Clark College in Portland, Oregon, majoring in theater and cultural anthropology. While there, he was introduced to a group called Prisoners of Politics, and began to take part in slam poetry and hip hop performances. Soon after graduating from Lewis and Clark, he attended the University of Florida, where he graduated magna cum laude with a Master of Fine Arts in acting. He has lived in Portland, Chicago, and Los Angeles.

Filmography

Film

Television

Video games

References

External links

21st-century American male actors
1982 births
Living people
American film actors of Pakistani descent
American male film actors
American male stage actors
American male voice actors
American male television actors
Lewis & Clark College alumni
Male actors from Chicago
Obie Award recipients
Pakistani emigrants to the United States
Pakistani expatriates in Botswana
Pakistani expatriates in Kenya
Pakistani expatriates in Eswatini
Pakistani expatriates in Tanzania
University of Florida alumni